Odin Thiago Holm (born Odin Holm; born 18 January 2003) is a Norwegian footballer who plays as a forward for Vålerenga. He was included in The Guardian's "Next Generation 2020".

Club career
Holm scored his first goal for Vålerenga on 22 December 2020 in a 4-0 win vs. IK Start.

Name change in 2017 
In 2017, he was granted an application to the Norwegian resident registration to take Thiago as a middle name. The name change was based on the fact that he has the football player Thiago Alcântara as a role model.

Career statistics

Club

Notes

References

2003 births
Living people
Footballers from Trondheim
Norwegian footballers
Norway youth international footballers
Association football forwards
Ranheim Fotball players
Vålerenga Fotball players
Eliteserien players